Lisati M. Milo-Harris (born 5 October 1996) is a New Zealand rugby union player who plays for  in the Bunnings NPC. His position is scrum-half. He played for the Chiefs in 2020.

Reference list

External links
itsrugby.co.uk profile

1996 births
People educated at St Peter's College, Auckland
New Zealand rugby union players
Living people
Rugby union scrum-halves
Auckland rugby union players
Taranaki rugby union players
Chiefs (rugby union) players
Southland rugby union players
Blues (Super Rugby) players
Northland rugby union players